Trichinothrips is a genus of thrips in the family Phlaeothripidae.

Species
 Trichinothrips breviceps
 Trichinothrips callipechys
 Trichinothrips fuscatus
 Trichinothrips latifrons
 Trichinothrips panamensis
 Trichinothrips pusillus
 Trichinothrips sensilis
 Trichinothrips strasseni

References

Phlaeothripidae
Thrips
Thrips genera